Metasia familiaris is a moth in the family Crambidae. It was described by Edward Meyrick in 1884. It is found in Australia, where it has been recorded from New South Wales and Tasmania.

The wingspan is 15–16 mm. The forewings are light ochreous brownish, the costa somewhat darker. There is a very small blackish spot on the costa at four-fifths and sometimes some scattered dark fuscous scales forming an ill-defined line from this to two-thirds of the inner margin. There are also some obscure dark fuscous hindmarginal dots. The hindwings are light ochreous, irregularly suffused with grey and with a faint darker line as in the forewings. The hind marginal dots are as in the forewings.

References

Moths described in 1884
Metasia